Charbel Farhat is the Vivian Church Hoff Professor of Aircraft Structures in the School of Engineering and the inaugural James and Anna Marie Spilker Chair of the Department of Aeronautics and Astronautics, at Stanford University. He is also Professor of Mechanical Engineering, Professor in the Institute for Computational and Mathematical Engineering, and Director of the Stanford-King Abdulaziz City for Science and Technology Center of Excellence for Aeronautics and Astronautics. He currently serves on the Space Technology Industry-Government-University Roundtable.

Farhat has received numerous awards and academic distinctions for his lasting contributions to aeroelasticity, CFD on moving grids, computational acoustics, computational mechanics, high performance computing, and model order reduction. He is listed as an ISI Highly Cited Author in Engineering by the ISI Web of Knowledge, Thomson Scientific Company.

From 2007 to 2018, he served as the Director of the Army High Performance Computing Research Center at Stanford University, and from 2015 to 2018, on the United States Air Force Scientific Advisory Board (SAB). He has also served on the technical assessment boards of several national and international research councils and foundations, and on the United States Bureau of Industry and Security's Emerging Technology and Research Advisory Committee (ETRAC) at the United States Department of Commerce.

Farhat was elected a member of the National Academy of Engineering in 2013 for contributions to computing fluid-structure interactions and their applications in aeronautical, naval, and mechanical engineering. He is also a Member of the Royal Academy of Engineering (International Fellow), a Member of the Lebanese Academy of Sciences, a recipient of a Docteur Honoris Causa from Ecole Normale Superieure Paris-Saclay, a recipient of a Docteur Honoris Causa from Ecole Centrale de Nantes, a recipient of a Docteur Honoris Causa from Ecole Nationale Superieure d'Arts et Metiers, and a Fellow of six international professional societies: the American Institute of Aeronautics and Astronautics, the American Society of Mechanical Engineers, the World Innovation Foundation, the International Association of Computational Mechanics, the US Association of Computational Mechanics, and the Society of Industrial and Applied Mathematics. He is also an Editor of the International Journal for Numerical Methods in Engineering, and the International Journal for Numerical Methods in Fluids.

Career
Farhat began his career at the University of Colorado at Boulder where he served as Chairman of the Department of Aerospace Engineering Sciences and Director of the Center for Aerospace Structures. He then moved to Stanford University where he occupies the Vivian Church Hoff Chair of Engineering, serves as Chairman of the Department of Aeronautics and Astronautics and Director of the King Abdulaziz City for Science and Technology Center of Excellence for Aeronautics and Astronautics, and served for 11 years as the Director of the Army High Performance Computing Research Center.

He is the developer of the Finite Element Tearing and Interconnecting (FETI) method for the scalable solution of large-scale systems of equations on massively parallel processors. FETI was incorporated in several finite element production and commercial software in the US and Europe. It enabled the Sandia National Laboratories’ structural dynamics code SALINAS to win a Gordon Bell Prize in the special accomplishment category based on innovation.

Farhat also developed the three-field computational framework for coupled nonlinear fluid-structure interaction problems. With his co-workers, he introduced the concept of a Discrete Geometric Conservation Law (DGCL) and established its relationship to the nonlinear stability of CFD schemes on moving grids. This led to the development of the nonlinear aeroelastic software AERO that is used for many applications ranging from the shape sensitivity analysis of Formula 1 cars, to the nonlinear flutter analysis of supersonic business jet concepts.

Research monographs
 Charbel Farhat and Francois-Xavier Roux, Implicit Parallel Processing in Structural Mechanics, Computational Mechanics Advances, Vol. II, No. 1, pp. 1–124 (1994)
 Charbel Farhat, Domain Decomposition and Parallel Processing, Postgraduate Studies in Supercomputing, ed. FNRS/NFWO, Universie de Liege, Belgium, 1992.
 Charbel Farhat, An Introduction to Parallel Scientific Computations, Postgraduate Studies in Supercomputing, ed. FNRS/NFWO, Universite de Liege, Belgium, 1991.

Awards and honors

 Docteur Honoris Causa (2022), Ecole Nationale Superieure d'Arts et Metiers
 The Commander's Public Service Award, Department of the Air Force (2019)
 Elected to the Lebanese Academy of Sciences (2017)
 Docteur Honoris Causa (2017), Ecole Centrale de Nantes
 Docteur Honoris Causa (2017), Ecole Normale Superieure Paris-Saclay
 The Spirit of St Louis Medal  (2017) and the Lifetime Achievement Award (2011), American Society of Mechanical Engineers 
 The Ashley Award for Aeroelasticity (2017) and the Structures, Structural Dynamics and Materials Award (2010), American Institute of Aeronautics and Astronautics (AIAA)
 The Grand Prize, Japan Society for Computational Engineering and Science (JSCES)  (2017)
 Elected to the Royal Academy of Engineering (UK) (2016)
 Designated by the US Navy recruiters as a Primary Key-Influencer (2014) and flown by the Blue Angels during Fleet Week 2014
 The Gauss-Newton Medal  (2014), the O.C. Zienkiewicz Award  (2012), the Computational Mechanics Award  (2002), and the John Argyris Award for Young Scientists  (1998), International Association of Computational Mechanics (IACM)
 Elected to the National Academy of Engineering (2013)
 Knighted by the Prime Minister of France in the Order of Academic Palms (2011)
 Medal of Chevalier dans l'Ordre des Palmes Academiques (2011)
 The John von Neumann Award  (2009), the J. Tinsley Oden Medal  (2001), and the R. H. Gallagher Special Achievement Award  (1997), United States Association of Computational Mechanics
 The Gordon Bell Prize (2002) and the Sidney Fernbach Award (1997), Institute of Electrical and Electronics Engineers Computer Society
 Modeling and Simulation Award (2001), United States Department of Defense
 IBM Sup’Prize Achievement Award (1995)
 The Arch T. Colwell Merit Award (1993), Society of Automotive Engineering
 Presidential Young Investigator Award (1989), National Science Foundation
 CRAY Research Award (1989)

References

External links
 Charbel Farhat's webpage
 ISI Highly Cited Author - C. Farhat
 Flying with the Blue Angels
 Flutter in the sky

Stanford University School of Engineering faculty
UC Berkeley College of Engineering alumni
Living people
American people of Lebanese descent
Fellows of the Society for Industrial and Applied Mathematics
Year of birth missing (living people)